Ultimatums to the Baltic governments may refer to:
Ultimatums to Estonia:
 1940 Soviet ultimatum to Estonia 
Ultimatums to Latvia:
 1940 Soviet ultimatum to Latvia 
Ultimatums to Lithuania:
 1938 Polish ultimatum to Lithuania
 1939 German ultimatum to Lithuania
 1940 Soviet ultimatum to Lithuania